Ian Moram (born February 8, 1980) is a Canadian pair skater. He teamed up with Jessica Miller in 2002. Miller and Moram trained at the BC Centre of Excellence and were coached by Bruno Marcotte. They announced their retirement from competitive skating on May 9, 2008.
Moram previously competed with Chantal Poirier and Meeran Trombley.

Competitive highlights

With Miller

With Poirier

With Trombley

Programs 
(with Miller)

References

External links
 
 Miller & Moram Fansite

1980 births
Canadian male pair skaters
Living people
Figure skaters from Montreal